The Wudang School, sometimes also referred to as the Wu-Tang Clan, is a fictional martial arts school mentioned in several works of wuxia fiction. It is commonly featured as one of the leading orthodox schools in the wulin (martial artists' community). It is named after the place it is based, the Wudang Mountains.

The Wudang School is featured most prominently in Jin Yong's novels The Heaven Sword and Dragon Saber and The Smiling, Proud Wanderer as a major power in the wulin, usually alongside Shaolin. Liang Yusheng's works also depict Wudang as the leader of all orthodox schools in the wulin. Most of its members are priests who follow Taoist customs and practices in addition to training in martial arts. However, unlike Shaolin's Buddhist monks, Wudang members are allowed to marry and start families. In some wuxia stories, Wudang has female members as well.

History
The school was founded in the early Yuan dynasty by Zhang Sanfeng. Zhang Sanfeng's original given name was "Junbao", and he was an apprentice of Jueyuan, a Shaolin monk. Zhang Sanfeng accepted seven youths as his apprentices, who later became known as the "Seven Heroes of Wudang". The seven are responsible for spreading Wudang's name through their prowess in martial arts, exemplary conduct, and deeds of gallantry.

In The Smiling, Proud Wanderer, believed to be set in the Ming dynasty, Wudang has become one of the two major powers in the wulin (martial artists' community) alongside Shaolin, and both schools play significant roles in upholding justice and maintaining peace in the community. In the novel, Wudang is led by Taoist Chongxu. In Baifa Monü Zhuan, set towards the end of the Ming dynasty, the school is led by Taoist Ziyang and another four elders.

Martial arts
Wudang's martial arts have their origins in the Shaolin School, although they are based on Taoism rather than Buddhism. Its martial arts revolve around the concept of taiji, as evident from the skills named after the concept, such as "taijiquan" and "taijijian". They also focus on the use of "soft and gentle" techniques to overcome opponents who rely on brute strength and force.

List of skills and martial arts
 Note: Although the skills listed here are entirely fictional, some are based on or named after actual martial arts.

 Foundation skills:
 Ten Rolls of Silk
 Thirty-two Styles of Long Fist
 Wudang Long Fist
 Wudang Heart Sutra
 Eight Trigrams Soaring Dragon Palm
 Armed combat styles:
 Divine Gate Thirteen Swords
 Heaven Relying Dragon Slaying Skill
 Mystical Saber Style
 Heaven and Earth as One
 Soft Snow Swordplay
 Turning Finger Soft Swordplay
 Taiji Swordplay
 Battle formations:
 Black Tortoise Seven Sections Formation
 Black Tortoise Sword Formation

 Unarmed combat styles:
 Infinite Mystical Skill Fist
 Dianxue Hand
 Heaven Shaking Iron Palm
 Taiji Fist
 Returning Wind Palm
 Great Tablet Smashing Hand
 Silky Palm
 Tiger Claw Ending Hand
 Tiger Claw Hand
 Stained Clothes Eighteen Falls
 Qinggong:
 Cloud-Ascending Ladder
 Inner energy skills:
 Wudang Nine Yang Skill
 Pure Yang Infinite Skill

See also
 Purple Cloud Temple
 Temple of the Five Immortals
 Wudang Mountains
 Wudangquan

References

Organizations in Wuxia fiction